WJBZ-FM (96.3 FM, "Praise 96.3") is a radio station licensed to serve Seymour, Tennessee.  The station is owned by M & M Broadcasting, Ron Meredith. It airs a Southern Gospel music format.

WJBZ-FM was started by the late J. Bazzel Mull, a longtime preacher and the founder of the Mull Singing Convention program.

The station was assigned the WJBZ-FM call letters by the Federal Communications Commission on August 28, 1990.
In 2015 Ron Meredith and M & M broadcasting bought the station. WJBZ’s format is Southern Gospel and was in jeopardy of changing formats.
M & M Broadcasting’s Ron Meredith and Jack Ryan (Eric Hammond) decided to dedicate one year to try to revive the station and the format.
In March or 2015 the station celebrated its 25th anniversary with an overwhelming community display during a station open house. That year the station was named Southern Gospel radio station of the year in the United States. The station repeated the accomplishment in 2016,2017,2018,2019,2020. A feat never before accomplished by another radio station.

References

External links
WJBZ official website

Southern Gospel radio stations in the United States
Radio stations established in 1991
Sevier County, Tennessee
JBZ-FM